A buccaneer is a type of pirate.

(The) Buccaneer(s) may also refer to:

Aviation
 Advanced Aeromarine Buccaneer, a one or two seat, ultra-light amphibious aircraft
 Blackburn Buccaneer, a British-built strike aircraft, in service from 1962 to 1994
 Brewster SB2A Buccaneer, a US close support aircraft
 Lake Buccaneer, a four-seat amphibious aircraft
Menasco Buccaneer, a 1930s-40s aero engine

Books
 Buccaneers (series), a children's book series written by Sheila K. McCullagh
 The Buccaneers, a novel by Edith Wharton

Entertainment
 Buccaneer (game), a board game published by Waddingtons
 Buccaneer (role-playing game), a 1979 role-playing game
 The Buccaneers (film), a 1924 film
  The Buccaneer (film), a 1938 film directed by Cecil B. DeMille
 The Buccaneers (TV series), a 1956 television series made by ITC Entertainment
  The Buccaneer (film), a 1958 film directed by Anthony Quinn
 Buccaneer (TV series), a BBC television series from 1980
 The Buccaneers, a 1995 BBC television mini-series from 1993, based on the novel of same name by Edith Wharton

Sports
 Buccaneer (mascot), the 1995 Pittsburgh Pirates baseball mascot
 Buccaneers RFC, a rugby union team based in Athlone, Co. Westmeath, Ireland
 Los Angeles Buccaneers, a former National Football League team
 Reading Buccaneers Drum and Bugle Corps
 Tampa Bay Buccaneers, an American football team
 Charleston Southern University Buccaneers
 Cape Cod Buccaneers, 1980s American ice hockey team
 Blackburn Buccaneers, an English ice hockey team
 Des Moines Buccaneers, an American ice hockey team
 Liverpool Buccaneers, an English rugby league team
 Oakland Buccaneers, an American soccer team
 Galveston Buccaneers, an American 1930s baseball team
 Christian Brothers Buccaneers and Lady Buccaneers, sports teams of Christian Brothers University, Memphis, Tennessee, United States
 New Orleans Buccaneers, American basketball team
 East Tennessee State Buccaneers and Lady Buccaneers, sports teams of East Tennessee State University, United States
 Bucaneros de La Guaira, a Venezuelan basketball team
 Bukaneros, ultras (fans) of Rayo Vallecano, Spanish association football team

Watercraft
 Buccaneer 200, an American keelboat design
 Buccaneer 210, an American keelboat design
 Buccaneer 220, an American keelboat design
 Buccaneer 240, an American keelboat design
 Buccaneer 245, an American keelboat design
 Buccaneer 250, an American keelboat design
 Buccaneer 255, an American keelboat design
 Buccaneer (dinghy), a type of light sailboat
 , a patrol boat of the Australian Navy
 , originally named Buccaneer, a United States Navy patrol vessel of World War II

Other uses
 Operation Buccaneer, an American government copyright anti-piracy project
 Buccaneer (musician) (Andrew Bradford; born 1974), Jamaican dancehall musician